Nån som du is a song written by Sonja Aldén, Bobby Ljunggren and Henrik Wikström, and recorded by Sonja Aldén on her 2008 album Under mitt tak. In early summer 2008, it was released as a single.

Chart performance

References

2008 singles
Sonja Aldén songs
Songs written by Bobby Ljunggren
Songs written by Henrik Wikström
Swedish-language songs
2008 songs
Songs written by Sonja Aldén